Castrol HONDA SuperBike World Champions is a licensed motorcycle racing game, developed by Intense Simulations Entertainment and Interactive Entertainment, Ltd. and published by Midas Interactive. The game features the Honda RVF750 RC45 and the riders of the 1997 Superbike World Championship season. The game title was chosen because John Kocinski won the 1997 World Superbike Championship on a Castrol Honda.

Gameplay 
The player controls a motorcyclist in races on various international race tracks. Game modes are "Practice" and "Championship". Each race has three parts: "Practice Session", "Qualifying" and "Race". There are closed-circuit Grand Prix tracks and street race tracks. The degree of "realism" can be modified (4 to 24 riders; 3 to 10 laps or "full race" which is 100 km). The bike setup offers tweaking of the gear sprockets. It is possible to play with five other players via network or splitscreen.

Reception 

The game received average reviews according to the review aggregation website GameRankings. Next Generation said that the game "had the potential to be a top-notch racing simulation. Instead, it's just another racing has-been. Check the bargain bins for a PC copy of Matrix TT [sic] – it's cheaper and a lot more fun."

The game was reviewed by the German magazine PC Games and received a rating of 74%. The reviewer concluded that while the game represented a bright spot among racing games, he was hoping for more simulation aspects.

Sequels and spin-offs 
There are three other games in the Castrol HONDA Superbike series, and each one was produced by Midas Interactive Entertainment:

 Castrol HONDA -World Superbike Team- Superbike Racing (1999 for PlayStation)
 Castrol HONDA -World Superbike Team- Superbike 2000 (1999 for PC)
 Castrol HONDA -World Superbike Team- VTR (2001 for PlayStation)

References

External links 
 

1998 video games
Motorcycle video games
Multiplayer and single-player video games
Racing video games
Superbike World Championship
Video games developed in the United Kingdom
Windows games
Windows-only games